Juul Respen (born 17 October 1998) is a Dutch footballer who plays as a forward for Derde Divisie club UNA.

Club career
He made his professional debut in the Eerste Divisie for VVV-Venlo on 4 November 2016 in a game against FC Dordrecht.

Respen ended his professional career in 2021 as part of Helmond Sport. Instead, he began studying to become a teacher and started playing football for Derde Divisie club EVV. On 17 March 2022, UNA announced that Respen would move to the club for the 2022–23 season.

References

External links
 

1998 births
People from Geldrop
Living people
Dutch footballers
VVV-Venlo players
Helmond Sport players
RKVV EVV players
VV UNA players
Eerste Divisie players
Derde Divisie players
Association football forwards
Footballers from North Brabant